Claus Grimm (born November 22, 1940) is a German art historian and from its founding in 1983 until 2007 he was director of the Bavarian historical institute Haus der Bayerischen Geschichte in Augsburg. He is considered an authority on Frans Hals and wrote a catalog raisonné in 1989.

References

External links
 Books by Claus Grimm on the Google Books Library Project

1940 births
Living people
German art historians
Writers from Augsburg
German male non-fiction writers